The women's 3000 metres at the 2022 World Athletics Indoor Championships took place on 18 March 2022.

Summary
Dawit Seyaum came into the race as the world leader and only Meraf Bahta returned from the final 4 years ago.

With nobody aggressively seeking the lead, Gabriela DeBues-Stafford, distinctive in her blue and yellow hair in support of Ukraine in time of war, found herself in front.  She held that spot for four laps until Seyaum decided she wanted to up the pace.  She was shortly joined by her Ethiopian teammates Ejgayehu Taye and Lemlem Hailu, with Kenyan rival Beatrice Chebet trying to jump into the mix.  After a few more laps, Elle Purrier St. Pierre injected herself into the leading group still jockeying, with DeBues-Stafford watching close behind them.  With three to go, Hailu hit the lead.  As the pace increased, the three Ethiopians, Purrier St. Pierre and DeBues-Stafford became a breakaway.  Down the back stretch, it was Purrier St. Pierre speeding past Seyaum and Taye, gaining rapidly on Hailu.  Through the final turn, Hailu held off Purrier St. Pierre with Taye having more speed pulling aside Purrier St. Pierre.  Coming on to the home stretch, Purrier St. Pierre sped up, stepped in front of Taye and went off in chase of Hailu.  Checking over her shoulder, Hailu knew the position of her rivals and maintained her lead to the finish line.

Results
The final was started at 20:25.

References

3000 metres
3000 metres at the World Athletics Indoor Championships